Heraclius Djabadary (17 October 1891 – 18 August 1937) was a Georgian composer and pianist who was active throughout Europe up until the 1930s. 

Djabadary was largely unknown in his homeland during his lifetime and was first discovered by Georgian audiences, then behind the Iron Curtain, in the 1940s. His music is noted for its fusion of Georgian folk themes with Western classical traditions.

Early life and education

Djabadary was born on 17 October 1891 in Tiflis, the capital city of Georgia, then part of the Russian Empire. In 1905 he entered the Royal Conservatory of Brussels, where he studied under Arthur De Greef and François-Auguste Gevaert.

In 1909 he went to Vienna to study composition under the direction of Richard Heuberger and piano under Juliusz Wolfson. In 1913, he made his debut in Vienna as a concert pianist with the Tonkünstler Orchestra under the baton of Oskar Nedbal, performing the "Georgian Rhapsody" that Djabadary had composed, which was well received. 

Later in 1913, he returned to Georgia and tried to make a musical career for himself there. However, after the Tsarist authorities decided to draft him into the Imperial Russian Army, which he despised, Djabadary had to leave the country again in 1915. After some time in France, Austria, and Switzerland, he settled in Paris in 1923, where gave a number of concerts, but after 1930 completely left the concert activity.

Jabadary's significant works include the "Georgian Rhapsody for Piano and Orchestra" ,  Piano Concerto in A Major, Op. 10 (1921), "Song of the Serpent" (French: La Melopée du Serpent) for flute and orchestra Op. 19, "Tiflisiana" for oboe and orchestra Op. 26.  He also authored an opera "Gulnara" (1919, based on Alexander Kazbegi), as well as a number of smaller compositions, such as the Nocturne in C Minor and  Variations on a Hungarian Chant for piano and cello.

Personal life

Djabadary was married to Margit Antonia Bárczy (1877-1934), a Hungarian aristocrat. Djabadary's Georgian Rhapsody was dedicated to her.

Death and legacy
Djabadary died of tuberculosis in Nice, France. After the composer's death, his brother Shota Djabadary promoted his music, publishing and performing orchestral arrangements of his piano pieces as a conductor. The revival of interest in the work of Djabadary is due to the pianist Henri Goraïeb, who recorded the Georgian Rhapsody and Piano Concerto together with the Luxembourg Philharmonic Orchestra conducted by Louis de Froment.

In 1967, 30 years after his death, Djabadary's remains were transferred from France back to his native Tbilisi and interred at the Didube Pantheon.

See also
Music of Georgia (country)
Victor Dolidze

References

Bibliography
 ა. ცამციშვილი. ერეკლე ჯაბადარის მუსიკალური მემკვიდრეობა: [უცხოეთში მოღვაწე ქართველი კომპოზიტორი. 1891—1932] // დროშა. — 1960. — No. 12. — გვ.18.
 ამირან ცამციშვილი. კომპოზიტორი ერეკლე ჯაბადარი // საბჭოთა ხელოვნება. — 1963. — No. 8. — გვ.49-57.
 ნინო ქიქოძე. ლადო გუდიაშვილის ორი უცნობი ესკიზი: [საქ-ს ლიტერატურისა და ხელოვნების ცენტრალურ არქივში დაცული კომპოზიტორისა და პიანისტის ერეკლე ჯაბადარის ოპერა «გულნარას» საფრანგეთში დადგმისათვის შესრულებული ესკიზების შესახებ] // საბჭოთა ხელოვნება. — 1983. — No. 1. — გვ.40-41.
 ამირან ცამციშვილი. სამშობლოდან გადახვეწილი ხელოვანი: [კომპოზიტორ და პიანისტ ერეკლე ჯაბადარის დაბადების 100 წლისთავის გამო] // ხელოვნება. — 1991. — No. 11-12. — გვ.38-46.

Classical composers from Georgia (country)
1891 births
1937 deaths
Male classical composers
Burials in Georgia (country)
19th-century classical composers
20th-century classical composers
Composers from Georgia (country)